Nina Kiru (Quechua  nina fire, kiru tooth, "fire tooth", also spelled Nina Kiro, Ninaquero) is an archaeological site with stone tombs (chullpa) in Peru. It was declared a National Cultural Heritage by RDN No. 496 of May 31, 2002. Nina Kiru lies in the Ayacucho Region, Lucanas Province, Carmen Salcedo District, near Antamarka (Andamarca).

References 

Archaeological sites in Peru
Archaeological sites in Ayacucho Region